Tibor Pézsa (born 15 November 1935) is a retired Hungarian fencer. He competed in the individual and team sabre events at the 1964, 1968 and 1972 Olympics and won one gold and three bronze medals; he won nine more medals at the world championships in 1962–1971.

References

1935 births
Living people
Hungarian male sabre fencers
Olympic fencers of Hungary
Fencers at the 1964 Summer Olympics
Fencers at the 1968 Summer Olympics
Fencers at the 1972 Summer Olympics
Olympic gold medalists for Hungary
Olympic bronze medalists for Hungary
People from Esztergom
Olympic medalists in fencing
Medalists at the 1964 Summer Olympics
Medalists at the 1968 Summer Olympics
Medalists at the 1972 Summer Olympics
Universiade medalists in fencing
Universiade bronze medalists for Hungary
Medalists at the 1959 Summer Universiade
Medalists at the 1961 Summer Universiade
Medalists at the 1963 Summer Universiade
Sportspeople from Komárom-Esztergom County